Matias Faldbakken (born 1973 in Hobro, Denmark) is a Norwegian artist and writer. Faldbakken studied at the National Academy of Fine Arts in Bergen and the Städelschule in Frankfurt am Main. He is the son of the author Knut Faldbakken, father of grov kar Gardar Faldbakken, and brother of film director Stefan Faldbakken.

Literary career
He made his literary debut in 2001 with The Cocka Hola Company, the first part of his Scandinavian Misanthropy Trilogy.  Macht und Rebel was released two years later, following most recently by Unfun, in Spring 2008, which completed his trilogy. All three novels are published under the pseudonym Abo Rasul and have not been translated into English. 

In 2006, Faldbakken released Kaldt produkt ("Cold Product") under his own name. It is a contemporary update of A Doll's House by Henrik Ibsen. Faldbakken commented to Dagbladet when it was released: "I am a spokesperson for totally anarchistic mayhem on a bed of traditional family values". It was performed at Staatstheater Stuttgart in 2008.

He has also released a collection of short stories called Snort Stories.

His 2017 novel The Hills, translated into English by Alice Menzies in 2018 and published as The Waiter (Scout Press), received positive reviews, notably from New York Times food critic Pete Wells.

Awards
Faldbakken received the Bjørnsonstipendet in 2002.

Affiliations

His publishers are Cappelen in Norway, Lindhardt og Ringhof in Denmark, Johnny Kniga in Finland, Blumenbar and Heyne in Germany, Mondadori in Italy, Suma in Spain, Limus in Russia, LWU in Lithuania, and Harvill in the UK.

Matias Faldbakken is represented by Paula Cooper Gallery in New York, Galerie Eva Presenhuber in Zurich and Vienna, Simon Lee Gallery in London, in Norway by Standard (Oslo) and in Berlin by Galerie Neu.

External links
 Salomonsson Agency
 Simon Lee Gallery, London.
 Galerie Eva Presenhuber
 Standard (Oslo)

References 

1973 births
Living people
People from Hobro
Städelschule alumni
Hamar Katedralskole alumni
People from Hamar
21st-century Norwegian novelists
Articles containing video clips
Norwegian contemporary artists